Ferrite-Domen Scientific Research Institute is a company based in Saint Petersburg, Russia. It is part of Ruselectronics.

NII Domen is well known for its ferrite materials, components, and devices, which are important elements of radioelectronic systems such as radars, radioastronomy, telecommunications, and of many others. SPA Ferrite is the leading Russian enterprise in the ferrite branch of the electronics industry.

References

External links
 Official website

Manufacturing companies of Russia
Companies based in Saint Petersburg
Ruselectronics
Electronics companies of the Soviet Union
Research institutes in the Soviet Union
Research institutes established in 1959
1959 establishments in the Soviet Union